The Hovhannes Tumanyan Puppet Theatre of Yerevan, officially the Yerevan State Puppet Theatre named after Hovhannes Tumanyan ( [Yerevani Hovhannes T'umanyani anvan Petakan Tiknikayin T'atron]), is a puppet theatre founded in 1935 and located in Yerevan, Armenia. It is also the location of the Pavlos Boroyan Puppet Museum.

History 
The Hovhannes Tumanyan Puppet Theatre of Yerevan was opened on 1 June 1935 by Sofia Bejanyan, painter Gevorg Arakelyan, actors Pavlos Boroyan, and Araksia Arabyan. The first director of the theatre was Varia Stepanyan. In 1938, the theatre was renamed after Hovhannes Tumanyan.

Between 1950 and 1957 the theatre was closed. However, on 27 July 1957, the theatre was reopened and Yervand Manaryan became the director. Since 1975, the theatre is operating in its current location on Sayat-Nova Avenue.

The theatre is also home to a puppet museum named after Pavlos Boroyan.

References

Theatres in Armenia
Armenian culture
Buildings and structures in Yerevan
1935 establishments in Armenia
Hovhannes Tumanyan